Pseudopostega galapagosae is a moth of the family Opostegidae. It was described by Donald R. Davis and Jonas R. Stonis, 2007. It is probably endemic to the Galápagos Islands where it has been collected on the islands of Fernandina, Isabela, San Cristóbal, Santa Cruz and Santiago.

The length of the forewings is 2.3–3.4 mm. Adults have been recorded from January to May.

Etymology
The species name is derived from the name of the general type locality, the Galápagos Islands of Ecuador.

References

Opostegidae
Endemic fauna of the Galápagos Islands
Moths of South America
Moths described in 2007